Nyhavn 18 is a listed property overlooking the Nyhavn canal in central Copenhagen, Denmark. The writer Hans Christian Andersen lived on the first floor from 1871 until shortly before his death on 4 August 1875. The building has now been converted into residences for visiting guest artists and scientists.

History

Early history
Nyhavn 18 was built in c. 1770 for merchant and shipowner Andreas  Bodenhoff and he lived there from when he was 62 years old as the building's first owner. It was then a three-storey building. The fourth storey was added in 1846.

Jonathan Balling, who worked for the Royal Greenland Trade Department, lived in the building until his death in 1829. He was one of Hans Christian Andersen's first benefactors in Copenhagen. Andersem spent Christmas with Balling  in 1822. The writer Andreas Nicolai de Saint-Aubain, who used the pseudonym Carl Bernhard, was a resident in the building from 1832 to 1865. The building was expanded with a fourth floor and a Mansard roof in 1846.

Hans Christian Andersen

Hans Christian Andersen was a lodger on the first floor from 23 October 1871, renting three rooms from Thora Hallager, a former photographer who now ran a boarding home at the address. He had also been her lodger at Lille Kongensgade 1. Crown Prince Frederik paid Andersen a visit in his home on 16 February 1873 and King Christian IX and Prince Valdemar paid him a visit on 23 February. On 1 July, Andersen moved in with the Melchior family in their summer residence Rolighed where he died on 4 August. Two of Andersen's friends, Matthias Weber and Erik Lassen, who both studied theology, lived on the second floor. Weber  later became the village pastor in Haslev. Lassen became a house teacher at Bregetnved and later pastor in Fakse Ladepalds and Herfølge. The writer and critic Georg Brandes has also lived on the first floor.

Later history

The building was listed by the Danish Heritage Agency in the Danish national registry of protected buildings in 1932. In 1959, Bank of Denmark purchased the building. Erik Møller Architects were commissioned to adapt the building for use as residences for foreign artists and scientists. The renovation received an award from Copenhagen Municipality in  1973.

Architecture
The building is six bays wide. Eril Møller Arkitekter replaced the Mansard roof with dormers from the 1840s expansion with a recessed fifth floor with glazed frontage. The also restored the gate and placed a triangular lift on the rear side of the building.

Today
The building contains seven residences. They are available to guest scientists and artists at Danish scientific and artistic institutions.

References

External links

 Official website
 Nyhavn 18 og H. C. Andersen
 Nyhavn 17 and H. C. Andersen
 Source
 Source

Listed residential buildings in Copenhagen
Buildings in Copenhagen associated with Hans Christian Andersen